is a passenger railway station  located in the city of Toyooka, Hyōgo Prefecture, Japan, operated by West Japan Railway Company (JR West). It serves the onsen (hot spring) district of Kinosaki.

Lines
The station is the dividing point between the electrified segment of the line up to Kyoto, and the non-electrified segment down to Hōki-Daisen. This is the farthest along the line that any regularly scheduled train from Kyoto will go (except the Hakuto Limited Express, which stops at Tottori Station but avoids the San'in Line for much of its route). Passengers wishing to continue onward must change trains at this station.

The station is also the departure point of an aerial tramway to the summit of Mount Daishi.

Limited express services
 Kounotori:  - Kinosaki Onsen (via the Fukuchiyama Line)
 Kinosaki: Kyoto - Kinosaki Onsen (via the Sanin Line)

Station layout
The station consists of two side platforms and one island platform serving four tracks at ground level. The platforms are connected by a footbridge, and the station has a Midori no Madoguchi staffed ticket office. Elevator access available on platforms 2, 3 & 4.

Platforms

Adjacent stations

History
It was renamed Kinosaki Onsen Station in 2005.

Passenger statistics
In fiscal 2017, the station was used by an average of 1048 passengers daily

Surrounding area
 Kinosaki Onsen

See also
List of railway stations in Japan

References

External links

 JR West station information 

Railway stations in Hyōgo Prefecture
Railway stations in Japan opened in 1909
Sanin Main Line
Toyooka, Hyōgo